The WF postcode area, also known as the Wakefield postcode area, is a group of 17 postcode districts in north-east England, which are subdivisions of eleven post towns. These cover much of southern and eastern West Yorkshire (including Wakefield, Pontefract, Dewsbury, Batley, Castleford, Heckmondwike, Knottingley, Liversedge, Mirfield, Normanton and Ossett), plus small parts of South and North Yorkshire.



Coverage
The approximate coverage of the postcode districts:

|-
! WF1
| WAKEFIELD
|  Agbrigg, Belle Vue, Eastmoor, Kirkthorpe, Newton Hill, Outwood, Wakefield City Centre
| Wakefield
|-
! WF2
| WAKEFIELD
| Alverthorpe, Carr Gate, Flanshaw, Hall Green, Kirkhamgate, Kettlethorpe, Lupset, Newmillerdam, Portobello, Sandal, Thornes, Walton (Wakefield), Wrenthorpe, Woolgreaves, Peacock, Pledwick
| Wakefield
|-
! WF3
| WAKEFIELD
| Bottom Boat, Carlton, East Ardsley, Lofthouse, Lofthouse Gate, Robin Hood,  Stanley, Thorpe, Tingley, West Ardsley
| Leeds, Wakefield
|-
! WF4
| WAKEFIELD
| Crigglestone, Crofton, Durkar, Flockton, Havercroft, Horbury, Middlestown. Netherton, New Crofton, Notton, Ryhill, West Bretton, Wintersett, Woolley 
| Wakefield, Kirklees
|-
! WF5
| OSSETT
| Gawthorpe, Healey, Ossett (very small area around Wakefield Road falls in the Kirklees district)
| Wakefield, Kirklees
|-
! WF6
| NORMANTON
| Altofts, Normanton
| Wakefield
|-
! WF7
| PONTEFRACT
| Ackworth Moor Top, Ackton, Featherstone, Purston Jaglin, Streethouse
| Wakefield
|-
! WF8
| PONTEFRACT
| Darrington, Kirk Smeaton, Little Smeaton, Pontefract (Monkhill), Thorpe Audlin 
| Wakefield, Selby, Doncaster
|-
! WF9
| PONTEFRACT
| Badsworth, Fitzwilliam, Hemsworth, Kinsley, South Elmsall, South Kirkby, Upton, Wentbridge
| Wakefield, Doncaster
|-
! WF10
| CASTLEFORD
| Airedale, Allerton Bywater, Castleford, Glasshoughton, Ledston, New Fryston
| Wakefield, Leeds
|-
! WF11
| KNOTTINGLEY
| Brotherton, Byram, Cridling Stubbs, Fairburn, Kellingley, Knottingley 
| Wakefield, Selby 
|-
! WF12
| DEWSBURY
| Briestfield, Chickenley, Dewsbury, Savile Town, Shaw Cross, Thornhill, Thornhill Lees, Whitley Lower
| Kirklees, Wakefield
|-
! WF13
| DEWSBURY
| Dewsbury Moor, Ravensthorpe, Staincliffe
| Kirklees
|-
! WF14
| MIRFIELD
| Battyeford, Hopton, Mirfield
| Kirklees
|-
! WF15
| LIVERSEDGE
| Hartshead, Hightown, Roberttown, Liversedge
| Kirklees
|-

! WF16
| HECKMONDWIKE
| Heckmondwike
| Kirklees
|-
! WF17
| BATLEY
| Birstall, Batley, Hanging Heaton, Soothill, Staincliffe
| Kirklees
|-
! style="background:#FFFFFF;"|WF90
| style="background:#FFFFFF;"|WAKEFIELD
| style="background:#FFFFFF;"|Redcats
| style="background:#FFFFFF;"|non-geographic
|}

Map

See also
Postcode Address File
List of postcode areas in the United Kingdom

References

External links
Royal Mail's Postcode Address File
A quick introduction to Royal Mail's Postcode Address File (PAF)

City of Wakefield
Postcode areas covering Yorkshire and the Humber